The Houston Jail is a historic jail building in Houston, Winston County, Alabama.  It was added to the National Register of Historic Places on June 5, 1975.

History
The building is the only known surviving log jail in the state and the only public building surviving from the time that the county seat was located in Houston.  It is believed by architectural historians to have been built circa 1868, when the now destroyed courthouse is known to have been constructed.  Houston was made the seat in 1858, but the minutes from a grand jury meeting in 1867 reported the need to build a courthouse and a jail.  The county seat was moved to Double Springs in 1884, resulting in Houston shrinking to the small unincorporated community that it is today.

It was converted into a residence for the poor in 1933, with the original split shake roof replaced with one of galvanized metal at this time.  The roof has since been restored back to shake.

Architecture
The jail is built of large squared logs joined by half notched corners.  It measures  with a front gabled roof.  The interior is divided into two rooms with an interlocking log wall.  A full raised foundation of fieldstone supports the structure.  The interior of the cell features continuous boards, turned at right angles to the logs and secured in place with  wooden nails to prevent prisoners from sawing their way out.  Likewise, the ceiling is formed by closely spaced  logs and the floor is plank over similarly spaced  logs.  The small square windows originally featured meshed iron bars.  The original door was made of three solid layers of  plank boards laid at angles to one another.

References

External links
Houston Historical Society: Houston Historic Jail

National Register of Historic Places in Winston County, Alabama
Government buildings completed in 1868
Jails on the National Register of Historic Places in Alabama
Defunct prisons in Alabama
Jails in Alabama
1868 establishments in Alabama